Walnut Street Historic District is a national historic district located at North Vernon, Jennings County, Indiana.  It encompasses 17 contributing buildings in a predominantly residential of North Vernon.  The district developed between about 1880 and 1950, and includes notable examples of Late Victorian and Bungalow / American Craftsman style architecture. Notable contributing buildings include the Platter House (1907), Charles Platter House (c. 1901), Frank Platter House (c. 1901), Gumble House (c. 1897), and John Cope House (c. 1870, 1892).

It was listed on the National Register of Historic Places in 2006.

References

Historic districts on the National Register of Historic Places in Indiana
Victorian architecture in Indiana
Historic districts in Jennings County, Indiana
National Register of Historic Places in Jennings County, Indiana